World-Wide Plaza may refer to:
 World-Wide House, an office building in Central District, Hong Kong, China
 One Worldwide Plaza, a high-rise building in New York, U.S.